The Compton Crook Award is presented to the best English language first novel of the year in the field of science fiction, fantasy, or horror by the members of the Baltimore Science Fiction Society at their annual science fiction convention, Balticon, held in Baltimore on Memorial Day weekend. The award, also known as the Compton Crook/Stephen Tall Award, has been presented since 1983.

The list of eligible books is published in the monthly newsletter so that all club members will have a chance to read and vote.  The winning author is invited to Balticon (BSFS pays transportation and lodging) for two years, and presented with the cash award of $1,000.  Compton Crook, who wrote under the name of Stephen Tall, was a long-time Baltimore resident, Towson University professor, and science fiction author who died in 1981.

Winners
 1983 - Donald Kingsbury, Courtship Rite
 1984 - Christopher Rowley, War For Eternity
 1985 - David R. Palmer, Emergence
 1986 - Sheila Finch, Infinity's Web
 1987 - Thomas Wren, Doomsday Effect
 1988 - Christopher Hinz, Liege-Killer
 1989 - Elizabeth Moon, Sheepfarmer's Daughter
 1990 - Josepha Sherman, The Shining Falcon
 1991 - Michael Flynn, In the Country of the Blind
 1992 - Carol Severance, Reefsong
 1993 - Holly Lisle, Fire in the Mist
 1994 - Mary Rosenblum, The Drylands
 1995 - Doranna Durgin, Dun Lady's Jess
 1996 - Daniel Graham Jr., The Gatekeepers
 1997 - Richard Garfinkle, Celestial Matters
 1998 - Katie Waitman, The Merro Tree
 1999 - James Stoddard, The High House
 2000 - Stephen L. Burns, Flesh and Silver
 2001 - Syne Mitchell, Murphy's Gambit
 2002 - Wen Spencer, Alien Taste
 2003 - Patricia Bray, Devlin's Luck
 2004 - E. E. Knight, Way of the Wolf
 2005 - Tamara Siler Jones, Ghosts in the Snow
 2006 - Maria V. Snyder, Poison Study
 2007 - Naomi Novik, His Majesty's Dragon
 2008 - Mark L. Van Name, One Jump Ahead
 2009 - Paul Melko, Singularity's Ring
 2010 - Paolo Bacigalupi, The Windup Girl
 2011 - James Knapp, State of Decay
 2012 - T. C. McCarthy, Germline
 2013 - Myke Cole, Control Point
 2014 - Charles E. Gannon, Fire With Fire
 2015 - Alexandra Duncan, Salvage
 2016 - Fran Wilde, Updraft
 2017 - Ada Palmer, Too Like the Lightning
 2018 - Nicky Drayden, The Prey of Gods
 2019 - R. F. Kuang, The Poppy War
 2020 - Arkady Martine, A Memory Called Empire
 2021 - Micaiah Johnson, The Space Between Worlds
 2022 - P. Djèlí Clark, A Master of Djinn

References

External links 
Compton Crook Award Winners Page

American literary awards
American speculative fiction awards
Regional and local science fiction awards
Awards established in 1983
First book awards
1983 establishments in the United States
Culture of Baltimore